Episcepsis moloneyi is a moth of the family Erebidae. It was described by Herbert Druce in 1897. It is found in Belize.

References

 

Euchromiina
Moths described in 1897